Qaleybuğurd  (also, Qalaybuğurt, Kalaybugurt, Kaleybugurt, and Keleybugurt) is a village and municipality in the Shamakhi Rayon of Azerbaijan.  It has a population of 807.

References 

Populated places in Shamakhi District